Phryganopteryx strigilata is a moth in the  subfamily Arctiinae. It was described by Saalmüller in 1878. It is found in Madagascar.

References

Natural History Museum Lepidoptera generic names catalog

Moths described in 1878
Phryganopterygina